Nationality words link to articles with information on the nation's poetry or literature (for instance, Irish or France).

Events
 After meeting with Jacques Peletier du Mans, Joachim du Bellay decides to go to Paris, where he meets Pierre de Ronsard and Jean-Antoine de Baïf, who were studying Greek and Latin under Jean Daurat, also a poet.

Works published
 Luigi Alamanni, La Coltivazione, didactic poem written in imitation of Virgil's Georgics, Italian writer published in Paris, France
 Ludovico Ariosto, Le Rime di M. Ludovico Ariosto, edited by Iacopo Coppa Modanese; Italy
 John Heywood, ; Great Britain

Births
Death years link to the corresponding "[year] in poetry" article:
 Philippe Desportes (died 1606), French poet
 Veronica Franco (died 1591), Italian poet and courtesan

Deaths
Birth years link to the corresponding "[year] in poetry" article:
 February 18 – Martin Luther died (born 1483), German theologian and poet
 July 16 – Anne Askew, also spelled "Anne Ayscough" (born 1521) English poet and Protestant who was persecuted as a heretic; the only woman on record to have been tortured in the Tower of London, before being burnt at the stake
 August 3 – Étienne Dolet (born 1509), French writer, poet and humanist
 Also:
 Pietro Bonomo, also known as "Petrus" (born 1458), Italian, humanist, diplomat, bishop of Trieste and Latin-language poet
 Nikolaus Decius died sometime after this year (born 1485), German

See also

 Poetry
 16th century in poetry
 16th century in literature
 French Renaissance literature
 Renaissance literature
 Spanish Renaissance literature

Notes

16th-century poetry
Poetry